Connie Mack (1862–1956) was an American baseball manager, player, owner and Hall of Famer

Connie Mack may also refer to:

Connie Mack III (born 1940), U.S. Representative (1983–1989), U.S. Senator (1989–2001) from Florida (grandson of Connie Mack)
Connie Mack IV (born 1967), U.S. Representative from Florida, 2005–2013 (son of Connie Mack III)

See also
Connie Mack Field, West Palm Beach, Florida
Connie Mack Stadium or Shibe Park, baseball park in Philadelphia
Connie Mak, female Hong Kong singer, also called Kitman Mak